Brachytrita is a genus of moths in the family Geometridae.

Species
Only one species is part of this genus:
Brachytrita cervinaria Swinhoe, 1904 from Tanzania.

References

Desmobathrinae